E10, E 10 or E-10 may refer to:
 E10 fuel, see Common ethanol fuel mixtures#E10 or less, a mixture of 10% ethanol and 90% petrol
 Diabetes mellitus type 1 ICD-10 code
 Entertainment Software Rating Board: E10+, the symbol for Everyone 10+, indicating material that may not be suitable for those under 10
 E10 screw, a type of Edison screw
 Olympus E-10, a single-lens reflex camera digital camera from 2000
 Queen's Pawn Game, Encyclopaedia of Chess Openings code
 The 10 elected members of the United Nations Security Council
 E10 (Lie algebra), a mathematical structure

Routing 
 E10 European long distance path
 E10, a postcode district in the E postcode area of east London 
 European route E10
 London Buses route E10
 Higashikyushu Expressway (between Kitakyushu JCT and Kiyotake JCT) and Miyazaki Expressway, route E10 in Japan
 New Pantai Expressway, route E10 in Malaysia

Vehicles 
 Chevy E10, an electric vehicle
 DB Class E 10, a 1952 German electric locomotive
 E 10, an experimental German light tank destroyer of World War II, part of the Entwicklung series
 E-10 MC2A, a Northrop Grumman military aircraft based on the Boeing 767-400ER airframe
 JNR Class E10, a class of Japanese steam locomotive
 LSWR E10 class, a British LSWR Locomotive
 SJ E10, a class of Swedish steam locomotives
 Toyota Corolla (E10), a car